The 1975 Northern Illinois Huskies football team represented Northern Illinois University as a member of the Mid-American Conference (MAC) during 1975 NCAA Division I football season. Led by Jerry Ippoliti in his fifth and final season as head coach, the Huskies compiled an overall record of 3–8 with a mark of 2–3 in conference play, placing seventh in the MAC. Northern Illinois played home games at Huskie Stadium in DeKalb, Illinois. This was their last year as an independent team, as they moved to the Mid-American Conference the following season. 1975 was the first season in which the Huskies competed in the MAC.

Schedule

References

Northern Illinois
Northern Illinois Huskies football seasons
Northern Illinois Huskies football